is a Japanese manga series by Wataru Watanabe, author of the manga series Yowamushi Pedal. The series follows Kōta Shibaki, a high school student, who trains with a witch named Rurumo through the use of magic tickets. However, whenever a ticket is used to make a wish, Shibaki's life will be shortened.

The first manga series was serialized in Kodansha's Monthly Shōnen Sirius magazine from October 2007 to 2011. A second and third manga have been serialized, from 2011 to 2013, and from 2013 to 2019, respectively. An anime television series adaptation produced by J.C.Staff aired from July to September 2014. Crunchyroll streamed the series.

Plot
Shibaki is a high-school boy whose only interest is girls. Except he's been branded as the most perverted boy at school and girls avoid him like the plague. One day he finds a book in the library about how to summon witches. He tries it as a joke, but it turns out to be the real thing. An apprentice witch named Rurumo appears to grant him a wish. Shibaki helps Rurumo and she in return refuses to take his soul. When the story starts, Shibaki wishes he could see Rurumo again. His wishes is granted immediately as Rurumo falls from the sky and crash lands in front of him. He finds out that as punishment for not taking his soul she's been busted down to an apprentice witch. Now, she must complete the task of getting Shibaki to use up 666 magic tickets that grant wishes before she can become a witch again. However, what she does not know is that each time he uses a ticket it shortens his life. When the last ticket is used up, Shibaki will die. Shibaki knows this because Rurumo's familiar black cat Chiro tell him as part of the "contract" for giving him the tickets. Now, Shibaki has a choice, make a wish and help Rurumo become a witch again or resist the temptation and try to save his own life.

Characters

A high school student. Because of his various perverted actions in the past, which earned him the title , every girl alienates him, leading to an empty school life. He is part of his school's resident  Club, but he's not interested in the occult.

A witch who made a contract with Shibaki. When Shibaki uses the tickets given to him, she can use magic to grant his wishes. On the outside, she looks like a normal middle school girl, and people usually assume she's a cosplayer, due to her clothes. She is expressionless and reticent to the extreme, but is by nature more shy than others, also being very clumsy and oblivious. After defying various rules, she was made to spend 60 years in prison.

She's Rurumo's magical familiar, a purple-furred cat. Chiro is the one that informs Shibaki that once he uses up all 666 tickets that Rurumo gave him, he will die. She is able to transform into a human girl at will, in which form she becomes a tan-skinned teenage girl. She used to be a stray cat, who tried selling magic wands for a living, but Rurumo offered her to become her familiar, for which she's very thankful.

Shibaki's mother, whom he fears very much due to her violent tendencies, whereby she would, at times, threaten him with a knife, especially when she thinks he might be doing something illegal, such as abducting minors. It is hinted that she has a reverse form of Oedipus complex towards Shibaki.

Shibaki's little brother, who is deeply frightened by his mother's violent tendencies.

The stern, straightforward president of the Mysterious Discovery Club, composed of himself, Shibaki, Mameo Fukusuke, and Hiro Tokoda. His real name is unknown. He expresses interest in Rurumo, and he often tries asking her to join the club. He is obsessed with the occult, often mistaking normal objects for UFOs. He frequently drags Shibaki, who he calls , into his schemes.

Rurumo's self-proclaimed rival. She joins the Mysterious Discovery Club, mainly due to having a crush on Senior. She claims to be a wizard, trying to impress Senior (who likewise ignores her advances), yet she fails to support her claim. She expresses very little interest in Shibaki, despite his attempts to impress her.

A member of the Mysterious Discovery Club. A short and squat boy, who is frequently seen eating dumplings.

Another member of the Mysterious Discovery Club. Tall and thin.

The head of the school's "Disciplinary Committee," who has an uptight personality. She takes her duty of enforcing the school rules very seriously, together with Kyouko and Shimomura. She and Shibaki are childhood friends, as their families are old friends, and has been going to the same school as him since Kindergarten. It is hinted that despite her usual attitude, she wants to be victimized by Shibaki's perversion. She also seems to have a weakness for cute things.

She is a member of the school's "Disciplinary Committee", where she serves as Inoue's secretary. She is an otaku who is into cosplay, which she keeps as a closely guarded secret. She befriends Rurumo, who she believes to be a cosplayer, and introduces her to the world of cosplaying and anime.

	
She is a member of the school's "Disciplinary Committee," along with Inoue and Shimomura. She serves as an enforcer, physically punishing anyone found guilty of violating the school rules and public morals. She does not speak very often, and is much stronger than she appears to be. She appears to have a crush on Sakurai, who noted her to be a gentle person.

A popular student, and the main victim of Shibaki's perversion. Despite his lecherous behavior, Sawashita does not seem to antagonize him like the other girls do. She seems to be good friends with Tanako.

A friend of Shibaki's, and also one of his "clients."

Another of Shibaki's friends and "clients", who seems to like picking on Nishino. He often tries to impress Rurumo, but is usually ignored.

Another of Shibaki's classmates and "clients," who is popular with the girls.

A stern high-tier witch. At first, she seems to be mean-spirited and abrasive, but is shown to have a softer side. She admires Rurumo, and is somewhat bothered by her unexpressiveness.

A childish yet strict state enforcer. She provides directions for Rurumo in episode 5, but Rurumo is unable to remember her assistance. She often fends off Shibaki's attempts to approach schoolgirls, as well as Iida herself, although she likes playing with him.

Media

Manga
The manga was serialized in Kodansha's shōnen manga magazine Monthly Shōnen Sirius from 2007 to 2011. The manga first appeared as a one-shot short story bonus for Watanabe's previous work Owarai Chibius (お笑いチビウス), included in Monthly Shōnen Sirius''' July 2007 issue, and then became a regular serialization from October 2007 to February 2011, compiled into total of seven tankōbon volumes. The second manga, Magimoji Rurumo: Magic World Arc (まじもじるるも 魔界編 Majimoji Rurumo: Makai-hen) began serialization on April 2011 until March 2013, compiled into 5 volumes. The ongoing third manga, titled Magimoji Rurumo: After School Magic Junior High Student (まじもじるるも 放課後の魔法中学生 Majimoji Rurumo: Hōkago no Mahō Chugakusei) begun serialization on July 2013 and ended on June 2019, compiled into nine tankōbon'' volumes.

Anime
An anime adaptation, produced by J.C.Staff and directed by Chikara Sakurai, it aired from July 9 to September 24, 2014, on AT-X and later on Tokyo MX, KBS Kyoto, Sun TV, TV Aichi, BS11, and NBC. Kodansha was simulcasting the series on Crunchyroll with subtitles in English. An OVA episode was bundled with the manga's 9th volume which was released on July 9, 2019.

References

External links
 Official Anime Website 
 Magimoji Rurumo at Kodansha  

2007 manga
2011 manga
2013 manga
2014 anime television series debuts
Anime series based on manga
Comedy anime and manga
Fantasy anime and manga
J.C.Staff
Slapstick comedy
Shōnen manga
Witchcraft in anime and manga
Witchcraft in written fiction
Witchcraft in television